Stefan Ackerie (born 1941), usually known by the mononym Stefan, is a businessman who owns a chain of hairdressing salons in Brisbane, Australia.

Early life
He was born in 1941 in Batroun, Lebanon. His family migrated when he was 15 to Adelaide, South Australia, where he trained as a hairdresser and learned to speak English at nightschool.

Career

He owns a chain of approximately fifty hairdressing salons throughout Queensland and New South Wales, as well as the Brisbane restaurant Jo Jo's, a bar and restaurant originally opened above the Queen Street Mall in the 1970s and now relocated to Melbourne Street, South Brisbane. He also owns Stefan's Boating World in Coomera on the Gold Coast.

Stefan's Brisbane headquarters is located in South Brisbane, underneath the Skyneedle, a landmark which Stefan bought to prevent it being moved overseas after World Expo '88. When the Milton Tennis Centre was demolished circa 1999, Stefan also rescued the  tennis racquet icon (based on the Aldila brand) erected there (he had sponsored the Queensland Tennis Open competition at that site). In June 2014, it was finally re-erected over the Frew Park tennis facility which replaced the Milton Tennis Centre.

Awards

In 2013 Stefan was presented a Queensland Greats Award from the Queensland Government.

Stefan was a finalist in the 2004 Australian of the Year awards. He is also a keen power boat racer and holds the records for the fastest crossing of Bass Strait and the fastest crossing of the Straits of Malacca.

Personal life
Stefan lives in Brisbane. He has two sons, Mike and Steven Ackerie. In the 1980s he had a highly publicised relationship with Australian journalist Liz Hayes. In 2009, he began a relationship with his long-time personal assistant, Rose King, who now manages The Bach Living along with her daughter Jess King.

References

External links 

 Stefan website

Living people
Businesspeople from Brisbane
1941 births
Queensland Greats